James Marshall Klebba is an American lawyer, having been Dean and Victor H. Schiro Professor of Law at Loyola University New Orleans College of Law.

References

Year of birth missing (living people)
Living people
Loyola University New Orleans faculty
American lawyers
Harvard Law School alumni
St. John's University School of Law alumni